This is a listing of the horses that finished in either first, second, or third place and the number of starters in the Hilltop Stakes, an American stakes race for three-year-old fillies at 1-1/16 miles on the turf held at Pimlico Race Course in Baltimore, Maryland.  (List 1973-present)

See also 
 Hilltop Stakes
 Pimlico Race Course
 List of graded stakes at Pimlico Race Course

References 

Flat horse races for three-year-old fillies
Turf races in the United States
Ungraded stakes races in the United States
Sports competitions in Baltimore
Pimlico Race Course
Horse races in Maryland
Recurring sporting events established in 1973